The 1975 Milan–San Remo was the 66th edition of the Milan–San Remo cycle race and was held on 19 March 1975. The race started in Milan and finished in San Remo. The race was won by Eddy Merckx of the Molteni team.

General classification

References

1975
1975 in road cycling
1975 in Italian sport
1975 Super Prestige Pernod